Barbados first competed at the Summer Olympic Games in 1968, and has participated in each Games since, with the exception of the 1980 Summer Olympics when Barbados joined the American-led boycott and has never competed in the Winter Olympic Games. The country's only Olympic medal is a bronze won by sprinter Obadele Thompson in the men's 100 metres at the 2000 Summer Olympics.

Barbados competed as part of the West Indies Federation in 1960. Barbadian athlete James Wedderburn was part of the 4 × 400 m relay team which won the bronze medal that year. Weightlifter Grantley Sobers also competed in 1960.

Timeline of participation

Medal tables

Medals by Summer Games

Medals by sport

List of medalists

See also 
 Sport in Barbados
 :Category:Olympic competitors for Barbados
 Barbados at the Commonwealth Games
 Barbados at the Paralympics
 British West Indies at the 1960 Summer Olympics
 List of flag bearers for Barbados at the Olympics

External links
 
 
 
 Barbados Olympic Association